Zebina is a genus of minute sea snails, marine gastropod mollusks or micromollusks in the family Zebinidae.

Species
Species within the genus Zebina include:
 
 Zebina acicula Laseron, 1956
 Zebina adamsiana (Weinkauff, 1881)
  † Zebina aquitanica (Cossmann & Peyrot, 1919)
 Zebina axeliana (Hertlein & Strong, 1951)
 Zebina benthicola Habe, 1961
 † Zebina bespiso Lozouet, 2015 
 Zebina bidentata (Philippi, 1845)
 Zebina browniana (d’Orbigny, 1842)
 Zebina constricta Laseron, 1956
 Zebina cooperi W. R. B. Oliver, 1915
 † Zebina dziki Kaim, 2004
 † Zebina fallax (Deshayes, 1864)
 † Zebina fusiformis (Gabb, 1873) 
 Zebina gabbii (Mørch, 1876) 
 Zebina hebes (Watson, 1883) 
 Zebina heronensis Laseron, 1956 
 † Zebina hungarica Szöts, 1953 
 Zebina inflata Laseron, 1956
 Zebina isolata Laseron, 1956
 Zebina kalinagorum Faber, 2017
 † Zebina killeblebana Ladd, 1966
 † Zebina kraussi (Turton, 1932)
 † Zebina levigatissima (Deshayes, 1864) 
 Zebina linearis Laseron, 1956
 Zebina malagazzae Sleurs & van Goethem, 2002
 Zebina maxima Bozzetti, 2007
  † Zebina metaltilana Ladd, 1966
 Zebina moolenbeeki Faber & Gori, 2016
 † Zebina nerina (d'Orbigny, 1852) 
  † Zebina neriniformis (Boettger, 1901)
 Zebina paivensis (Watson, 1873)
 Zebina preposterum (Berry, 1958)
 Zebina pupiniformis (Preston, 1908)
 Zebina reclina Sleurs, 1991
 Zebina retusa Sleurs, 1991
 Zebina robustior (Gofas, 1999)
  † Zebina sanctimartini Lozouet, 2011
  † Zebina sarcignanensis Lozouet, 2015
  † Zebina schwartzi (Deshayes, 1861)
 Zebina semiglabrata (A. Adams, 1854)
 Zebina semiplicata (Pease, 1863)
 Zebina sloaniana (d'Orbigny, 1842)
 Zebina striaticallosa Faber, 2011
 † Zebina subneriniformis Lozouet, 1999 
 Zebina tridentata (Michaud, 1830) 
 Zebina unamae Rolan, 1998
 Zebina villenai Rolán & Luque, 2000
 Zebina vitrea (C. B. Adams, 1850)
 Zebina vitrinella (Mörch, 1876)
 † Zebina zitteli Szöts, 1953 
 † Zebina zuschini Harzhauser, 2014

Species brought into synonymy
 Zebina cordorae De Jong & Coomans, 1988: synonym of Zebina vitrinella (Mörch, 1876)
 Zebina hebes (Watson, 1883): synonym of Eulima hebes Watson, 1883
 Zebina japonica (Weinkauff, 1881): synonym of Takirissoina japonica (Weinkauff, 1881)
 Zebina laevigata (C. B. Adams, 1850): synonym of Zebina sloaniana (d'Orbigny, 1842)
 Zebina lis Tomlin, 1918: synonym of Zebina pupiniformis (Preston, 1908)
 Zebina nitens Laseron, 1956 : synonym of Zebina oryza (Garrett, 1873) (junior secondary synonym)
 Zebina punctostriata Talavera, 1975: synonym of Rissoina punctostriata (Talavera, 1975)
 Zebina spirata Sowerby, 1825: synonym of Rissoina spirata Sowerby I, 1820

References

 Adams H. & Adams A. (1853-1858). The genera of recent Mollusca; arranged according to their organization. London, van Voorst. Vol. 1: xl + 484 pp.; vol. 2: 661 pp.; vol. 3: 138 pls. 
 Gofas, S.; Le Renard, J.; Bouchet, P. (2001). Mollusca, in: Costello, M.J. et al. (Ed.) (2001). European register of marine species: a check-list of the marine species in Europe and a bibliography of guides to their identification. Collection Patrimoines Naturels, 50: pp. 180–213 
 Rolán E., 2005. Malacological Fauna From The Cape Verde Archipelago. Part 1, Polyplacophora and Gastropoda
 Spencer, H.G., Marshall, B.A. & Willan, R.C. 2009 Recent Mollusca. pp 196–219 in: Gordon, D.P. (Ed.), The New Zealand inventory of biodiversity. 1. Kingdom Animalia: Radiata, Lophotrochozoa, Deuterostomia. Canterbury University Press, Christchurch